Pmod interface (peripheral module interface) is an open standard defined by Digilent Inc. in the Digilent Pmod Interface Specification for connecting peripheral modules to FPGA and microcontroller development boards.

Overview
Modules are available from simple push buttons to more complex modules with network interfaces, analog to digital converters or LCD displays. These modules can be used with a variety of FPGA or microcontroller development boards from different vendors. Pmods are not necessarily plug-and-play - software and configuration is required - but the hardware interface is pre-designed and modules can be quickly assembled with host boards for prototyping or evaluation purposes with no soldering required.

Pmods come in a standard 6-pin interface with 4 signals, one ground and one power pin. Double and quad Pmods also exist. These duplicate the standard interface to allow more signals to pass through to the module.

Pmods can use either SPI, I2C or UART protocol. With I2C it is possible to use a 4-pin connector. Alternatively the pins 1 to 4 can be used as simple digital I/O pins.

Revisions

See also

 Asynchronous serial bus such as RS-232 and RS-422.
 UEXT

References

External links
 Pmod modules - Digilent
  - YouTube

Electrical signal connectors